Pereira (Portuguese and Galician for "pear tree") may refer to:

People
 Pereira (surname)

Places
Brazil
Pereira (Bahia) (est. 1534) in the present-day Barra neighborhood of Salvador in Bahia
Pereira Barreto, municipality in São Paulo
Pereiras, municipality in São Paulo
Colombia
Pereira, Colombia, capital city of the department of Risaralda
Portugal
Pereira (Barcelos), a parish in the district of Barcelos
Pereira (Mirandela), a parish in the district of Mirandela
Pereira (Montemor-o-Velho), a parish in the district of Montemor-o-Velho

Other
 Deportivo Pereira, a Colombian association football club
X-28 Sea Skimmer or Pereira X-28 Sea Skimmer, a single-seat flying boat
Pereira approach, a law method

See also
Pereiro (disambiguation)